Natalie Diane Vértiz González (born September 29, 1991) is a Peruvian TV Host, model and beauty pageant titleholder who represented Peru at Miss Universe 2011. Vértiz was born in Ferreñafe and went to high school to Queen of Angels School also in Lima.

Pageants
Natalie, who is a resident of Pompano Beach, Florida, competed in Miss Perú 2011, representing the Peruvian community in the United States, where she was one of 12 finalists and obtained the title of Miss Perú 2011, as well as the Best Body and Miss Silhouette awards. Her nutritionists and trainers, Christopher Rios, Daniel Rios and Xavier Rios, succeeded with his advisement towards her winning of the "Best Body" Award.

Natalie represented Peru at the Miss Universe 2011 pageant, broadcast live from São Paulo, Brazil on September 12, 2011, but failed to place.

On March 17, 2014, Vértiz and boyfriend Jacobo (Yaco) Eskenazi Álvarez welcomed a son. Eskenazi proposed to Vertiz live on the competition show, "Esto es Guerra". Jewish-raised Eskenazi and Catholic-raised Vértiz married in a civil ceremony on July 11, 2015.

On August 7, 2021, Natalie and Yaco welcomed their second son, Leo Eskenazi Vertiz. The couple are parents to two boys.

References

External links

1991 births
Living people
Peruvian beauty pageant winners
Peruvian female models
Miss Peru
Miss Universe 2011 contestants
People from Pompano Beach, Florida